Mansfeld, sometimes also unofficially Mansfeld-Lutherstadt, is a town in the district of Mansfeld-Südharz, in Saxony-Anhalt, Germany.

Protestant reformator Martin Luther grew up in Mansfeld, and in 1993 the town became one of sixteen places in Germany to be designated a Lutherstadt for this reason.

Geography
Together with neighbouring Eisleben, it is part of the historic Mansfeld Land region, roughly corresponding to the former district of Mansfelder Land which in 2007 merged into present Mansfeld-Südharz district.

Mansfeld station is a stop on the Mansfeldbahn railway line (Wipperliese), a branch of the Berlin-Blankenheim railway, running from Klostermansfeld to Wippra.

Town districts
The township currently comprises 15 districts (Ortschaften):

The former municipalities Annarode, Biesenrode, Gorenzen, Großörner, Möllendorf, Piskaborn, Siebigerode and Vatterode were merged into Mansfeld in 2005, Abberode, Braunschwende, Friesdorf, Hermerode, Molmerswende and Ritzgerode in 2009.

History
The House of Mansfeld, whose members belonged to the Saxon nobility and served as counts in the Hassegau, was first documented in a 973 deed. The counts built Mansfeld Castle, whose foundations date back to the late 11th century, when one Hoyer of Mansfeld served as field marshal to Emperor Henry V. The first reference of the fortress coincides with the extinction of the elder line in 1229. The estates were inherited by the Lords of Querfurt, who also adopted the comital title, calling themselves Counts of Mansfeld from that time on.

The settlement of Mansfeld received town privileges in 1400, and grew through the development of copper and silver mining, an activity in which Hans Luder from Möhra, father to Martin Luther and Mansfeld citizen from 1484, was employed as a master smelter. Luther's family had arrived into a modest prosperity, he himself attended the local school between 1488 and 1496. The building known as "Luther's School" had to be torn down and rebuilt in 2000 due to structural problems. His parents' house is preserved and today a museum. Luther also acted as an altar server at the St George parish church.

The Counts of Mansfeld had already lost Imperial immediacy in 1580. When the comital line finally became extinct in 1780, the estates around Mansfeld were incorporated into the Prussian Duchy of Magdeburg. The town retained the status of an independent city (Immediatstadt), it was temporarily part of the Napoleonic Kingdom of Westphalia and after the 1815 Congress of Vienna belonged to the Prussian Province of Saxony.

Politics

Seats in the town's assembly (Stadtrat) as of 2014 local elections:
Christian Democratic Union of Germany (CDU): 5
Social Democratic Party of Germany (SPD): 4
The Left: 2
Free Voters: 8
Independent: 1

Notable people
Martin Luther Religious revolutionary, leader of Protestant revolution, philosopher
Johann Wigand (–1587), Lutheran cleric
Johann Karl Ehrenfried Kegel (1784–1863), agronomist and explorer of the Kamchatka Peninsula
Franz Wilhelm Junghuhn (1809–1864), botanist and geologist
Arthur Gaebelein (1891–1964), footballer
Wolfgang Zeller (1893–1967), composer

References

Martin Luther
Towns in the Harz
Mansfeld
Mansfeld-Südharz